Pergusa may refer to:

 Pergusa, an Italian village of Sicily
 Pergusa Lake, lake in Sicily
 Autodromo di Pergusa, automobile and motorcycle circuit in Sicily